Pitcairnia turbinella, synonym Pepinia turbinella,  is a species of flowering plant in the family Bromeliaceae, native to Colombia and Venezuela. It was first described by Lyman Bradford Smith in 1942.

References

turbinella
Flora of Colombia
Flora of Venezuela
Plants described in 1942